Parectopa viminea is a moth of the family Gracillariidae. It is known from Peru.

References

Gracillariinae
Moths described in 1915